August Friedrich Carl von Brandis (12 May 1859 in Berlin-Haselhorst - 18 October 1947 in Aachen) was a German impressionist painter, best known for his interiors. He painted Aachen Cathedral in several works.

Biography 

August von Brandis came from the old noble family of Brandis from Alfeld an der Leine. Brandis attended the Prussian Academy of Arts in Berlin where he was taught by Hugo Vogel and Anton von Werner.

From 1884 he taught art at the Technical University of Gdansk, where he became a professor in 1904. Brandis worked together with Adolf Hölzel at his painting school "Neu-Dachau" and was a member of the Künstlerkolonie Dachau (artists’ colony of Dachau). Originally being an artist of historism in Dachau Brandis changed his style to impressionism. He received in 1910 and 1911 Gold Medal for Art by the Emperor Wilhelm II. at the Great Berlin Art Exhibition and 1911, and the Gold Medal of the Art Exhibition in Munich. 

In 1909 he succeeded Alexander Frenz at the Faculty of Architecture of the RWTH Aachen as a full "professor of figure and landscape painting", and became dean in 1929. In Aachen Brandis had his most successful and creative years. In Kaldenkirchen his parents-in-law had a house with a large garden, August von Brandis spent many time in the Rokoko pavilion.

He died in 1947 and was interred at the Waldfriedhof à Aachen.

Notes

Further reading
 Hammer, Wolfgang; Petzold, Andreas: August von Brandis 1859–1949, Monschau/Aachen, 1999.

External links 
 

1859 births
1947 deaths
Artists from Berlin
People from Aachen
Academic staff of the Gdańsk University of Technology
Prussian Academy of Arts alumni
German Impressionist painters
19th-century German painters
German male painters
20th-century German painters
20th-century German male artists
19th-century German male artists
German untitled nobility